John William Hargreaves (28 November 1945 – 8 January 1996) was an Australian actor. He won three Australian Film Institute Awards and was nominated six times.

Background
Hargreaves was educated at Marist College Kogarah. He taught in Mendooran, New South Wales, but moved to Sydney in the 1960s. He graduated from the National Institute of Dramatic Art in 1970. Hargreaves was mainly a film actor, but is also well-remembered by Australian audiences for the title role in the TV drama Young Ramsay in the 1970s and worked in a number of stage productions. Hargreaves had roles in The Removalists, Don's Party, The Odd Angry Shot, and Malcolm. He was also the love interest of Nicole Kidman in Emerald City.

In 1994 he became the first actor to receive the Byron Kennedy Award.

Personal life and death
Although he had exclusively heterosexual relationships while young, by the early 1980s Hargreaves acknowledged and embraced his homosexuality. Between 1984 and 1988, he partnered with French actor Vincent Perrot.

Hargreaves contracted HIV about 1994 and died of AIDS-related complications in a hospice in Sydney on 8 January 1996. Pallbearers at Hargreaves' funeral included actors Sam Neill and Bryan Brown.

Filmography

 
Below The Line Credits
 Without A Clue (1988) – runner
 
Other Credits
Second Best (1994)
completion guarantee services (The Completion Bond Company Inc) Whore (1991)

References

External links

John Hargreaves at the National Film and Sound Archive
John Hargreaves: Tribute to an Aussie cinema pioneer and legend http://www.australiantimes.co.uk/john-hargreaves-tribute-to-an-aussie-cinema-pioneer-and-legend/

1945 births
1996 deaths
20th-century Australian male actors
AIDS-related deaths in Australia
Australian male film actors
Best Actor AACTA Award winners
Best Supporting Actor AACTA Award winners
Australian gay actors
Logie Award winners
National Institute of Dramatic Art alumni
People from the Northern Rivers
20th-century Australian LGBT people